Norman Andrew Fleck FREng, FRS (born 11 May 1958) is a British engineer, Professor, and Director of the Cambridge Centre for Micromechanics.
He is a Fellow of Pembroke College, Cambridge, and of the Royal Academy of Engineering.

He earned a B.A. (1979) and Ph.D. (1983) from the University of Cambridge.

In December 2020, Fleck reported on the condition of London's Hammersmith Bridge suggesting that its closure may have been overly cautious, and that, after minimal work, the bridge could be reopened to cyclists and pedestrians.

References

External links
Professor Norman Fleck: Official website
http://www-g.eng.cam.ac.uk/125/now/naf.html

English mechanical engineers
Fellows of Pembroke College, Cambridge
Fellows of the Royal Society
Fellows of the Royal Academy of Engineering
1958 births
Academics of the University of Cambridge
Engineering professors at the University of Cambridge
Living people